2,000,000 Voices is Angelic Upstarts's  third album, released in 1981.

Track listing
All tracks composed by Thomas Mensforth and Ray Cowie; except where noted
Side A

Side B

Personnel
Angelic Upstarts
Mensi (Thomas Mensforth) - vocals, trumpet, cello
Mond (Raymond Cowie) - acoustic and electric guitar, backing vocals, percussion
Glyn Warren - bass, washboard
Derek "Decca" Wade - drums, percussion, backing vocals
with:
Paul Thompson - drums on "England", "Heath's Lament", "Kids On the Street" and "Jimmy"
Mickey Smailes - piano on "I Wish"
Simon Wilson - saxophone
Johnny Van Derrick - violin
Technical
Chris Stone, Pat Stapley - engineer
Keith Breeden - cover art

References

1981 albums
Angelic Upstarts albums
EMI Records albums
Albums recorded at Trident Studios